The  San Diego Chargers season was the franchise's 15th season in the National Football League (NFL) and its 25th overall. From a 6–10 record in 1983, the team improved to 7–9. Despite winning seven games, the Chargers failed to win a single game within their division.

Before the second game of the season against the Seattle Seahawks, running back Chuck Muncie missed the team's charter flight from San Diego. He told Chargers coach Don Coryell that he was late because vandals slashed the four tires on his car, but Coryell did not believe him. Muncie arrived in Seattle, but he was sent back to San Diego and did not play. Two days later, he was traded to the Miami Dolphins for a second-round draft pick; however, a urinalysis given by Miami detected cocaine, and the trade was voided. Afterwards, Muncie entered an Arizona drug rehabilitation center for a month. On November 15, he was suspended indefinitely by the NFL; Muncie never played another NFL game.

Draft

Roster

Schedule

Note: Intra-division opponents are in bold text.

Game summaries

Week 1

Source: Pro-Football-Reference.com

Week 2

Week 3

Week 6
This was the last time the Chargers defeated the Packers until Week 9, 2019.

Standings

References

External links
1984 San Diego Chargers at pro-football-reference.com

San Diego Chargers
San Diego Chargers seasons
San Diego Chargers f